Riverside is a neighborhood in Cincinnati, Ohio. The West Side neighborhood is contained in a narrow strip of land along the Ohio River between Sayler Park and Sedamsville. It is a community that is more industrial than residential. It is home to St. Vincent De Paul Catholic Church. Riverside is also home to the Mount St. Joseph University ball fields.

The population was 2,513 at the 2020 census.

History
Peter Zinn was the village's first mayor. The village was annexed by the City of Cincinnati in 1896.

Transportation
U.S. Route 50 runs directly through all of Riverside. It also has railroad tracks going through and is the main way trains get from the west to Cincinnati. Riverside is also home to the historic Anderson Ferry that was established in 1817. Anderson Ferry is the only ferry in the area and gets people from the westside of Cincinnati to Boone County, Kentucky.

References

Neighborhoods in Cincinnati